There are a variety of schema for dividing Wisconsin into regions.

Physical Geography
Professor Lawrence Martin created a schema for dividing Wisconsin into geographical regions in his work "The Physical Geography of Wisconsin".
 
 Western Upland
 Eastern Ridges and Lowlands
 Central Plain
 Northern Highland 
 Lake Superior Lowland

Three of these geographical provinces are uplands and two are lowlands. These provinces are related to the use of the land by plants, by animals, and by man. Each differs from the others in roughness or smoothness of topography, infertility or sterility of soil, in climate, in adaptation to occupation by wild plants (including forests), by cultivated plants (including crops and orchards), by animals, and by man, as well as in the extent to which men have developed such resources during the march of Wisconsin history.

The boundaries of all five provinces are determined largely by the variations of texture and structure in the underlying rocks. The geographical regions have internal unity and significant contrast with neighboring regions in uses of the land by living things, including man.

Wisconsin Department of Natural Resources Regions

The Wisconsin DNR uses the following regions
 Northern (NO)
 Counties: Ashland, Barron, Bayfield, Burnett, Douglas, Iron, Polk, Price, Rusk, Sawyer, Taylor, Washburn. Florence, Forest, Langlade, Lincoln, Oneida, Vilas
 Northeast (NE)
 Counties: Brown, Calumet, Door, Fond du Lac, Green Lake, Kewaunee, Manitowoc, Marinette, Marquette, Menominee, Oconto, Outagamie, Shawano, Waupaca, Waushara, Winnebago
 South Central (SC)
 Counties: Columbia, Dane, Dodge, Green, Grant, Iowa, Jefferson, Lafayette, Richland, Rock, Sauk
 Southeast (SE)
 Counties: Kenosha, Milwaukee, Ozaukee, Racine, Sheboygan, Walworth, Washington, Waukesha
 West Central (WC)
 Counties: Adams, Buffalo, Chippewa, Clark, Crawford, Dunn, Eau Claire, Jackson, Juneau, La Crosse, Marathon, Monroe, Pepin, Pierce, Portage, St. Croix, Trempealeau, Vernon, Wood

Wisconsin DOT Regions
The Wisconsin DOT uses the following regions:
 North Central Region
 Counties: Adams, Florence, Forest, Green Lake, Iron, Langlade, Lincoln, Marathon, Marquette, Menominee, Oneida, Portage, Price, Shawano, Vilas, Waupaca, Waushara and Wood counties.
 Northeast Region
 Counties: Brown, Calumet, Door, Fond du Lac, Kewaunee, Manitowoc, Marinette, Oconto, Outagamie, Sheboygan and Winnebago counties.
 Northwest Region
 Counties: Ashland, Barron, Bayfield, Buffalo, Burnett, Chippewa, Clark, Douglas, Dunn, Eau Claire, Jackson, Pepin, Pierce, Polk, Rusk, Sawyer, St. Croix, Taylor, Trempealeau and Washburn counties.
 Southeast Region
 Counties: Kenosha, Milwaukee, Ozaukee, Racine, Walworth, Washington and Waukesha counties.
 Southwest Region
 Counties: Columbia, Crawford, Dane, Dodge, Grant, Green, Iowa, Jefferson, Juneau, La Crosse, Lafayette, Monroe, Richland, Rock, Sauk and Vernon counties.

References

 
States and territories established in 1848